The Liffey Valley Reserve is a nature reserve comprising four separate parcels of land, with a combined area of , in the Liffey Valley of northern Tasmania, Australia. It is owned and managed by Bush Heritage Australia (BHA).

History
Two of the component reserves, Liffey River and Dry's Bluff (Taytitikitheeker), were purchased by Dr Bob Brown in 1990, in order to protect them from being logged.  These became the first reserves of the Australian Bush Heritage Fund, now Bush Heritage Australia.  The third reserve, Coalmine Creek, was purchased at the same time for much the same reason, and was donated to BHA in 2003. The fourth reserve, Oura Oura was donated in 2011.

Landscape and vegetation
Vegetation types range from alpine heath to wet and dry sclerophyll forests, with temperate rainforest gullies.

Fauna
Mammals recorded from the reserve are Tasmanian devils and platypuses as well as bandicoots, bettongs, potoroos and pygmy possums.  Birds found there include threatened Tasmanian wedge-tailed eagles, pink robins and yellow-tailed black-cockatoos.

References

External links
 Bush Heritage Australia

Bush Heritage Australia reserves
Nature reserves in Tasmania